A tidal barrage is an artificial obstruction at the mouth of a tidal watercourse, in contrast to a normal barrage along a river's inland course.

Purpose
The common primary functions of a barrage are:

 Increase the depth of a river (similar to a weir)
 Maintain a separation between fresh and salt water
 Reduce the risk of tidal flooding up the river

Secondary functions may include: 

 Tidal power generation
 Artificial whitewater leisure centres
 Form a Coastal reservoir

Notable barrages

 Cardiff Bay Barrage
 Goolwa Barrages
 Marina Barrage
 Prakasham Barrage
 Swansea barrage
 Tees Barrage
 West Sea Barrage

Power Station Barrages
 Rance tidal power plant
 Annapolis Royal Generating Station (Decommissioned)
 Sihwa Lake Tidal Power Station
 Kislaya Guba Tidal Power Station
 Jiangxia Tidal Power Station

Proposed barrages
 Severn Barrage across the River Severn between Wales and England
 Mersey Barrage across the Mersey Estuary in England

See also
 Dam
 Floodgate
 Thames Barrier
 Weir

Weirs
Rivers